Lu Feifei (born 10 November 1995) is a Chinese footballer who plays as a goalkeeper. She has been a member of the China women's national team.

References

1995 births
Living people
Chinese women's footballers
Women's association football goalkeepers
China women's international footballers